Zizhou County is a county of Yulin, Shaanxi, China.

Administrative divisions
As 2019, Zizhou County is divided to 11 subdistricts, 5 towns and 1 townships.
Subdistricts
 Binhexinqu Subdistrict

Towns

Townships
 Tuoerxiang Township()

Climate

Transport
 Shenmu–Yan'an Railway

References

County-level divisions of Shaanxi
Yulin, Shaanxi